Robert J. Davies (born 12 October 1948) was the chief executive of Arriva PLC from 1998 to 2006.

Davies attended King Edward VII School in Sheffield, going on to graduate with a degree in law from the University of Edinburgh. He is a Fellow of the Chartered Institute of Management Accountants and holds an honorary doctorate (LLD) from the University of Sunderland.

In 1998 he was named chief executive of Arriva, a position he held until 2006. In July 2012, he was appointed Chairman of Home Group.



References

1948 births
People educated at King Edward VII School, Sheffield
Living people
Alumni of the University of Edinburgh